Bada Kouni is a village on the island of Anjouan in the Comoros. According to the 1991 census the town had a population of 1,828 residents. The current estimate for 2009 is 3,218 residents.

References

Populated places in Anjouan